Wayne Andrews may refer to:
Wayne Andrews (historian) (1913–1987), American historian
Wayne Andrews (cricketer) (born 1958), Western Australian cricketer
Wayne Andrews (footballer) (born 1977), English association footballer